The Torentje (English: "The Little Tower"), located at the Binnenhof in The Hague next to the Mauritshuis museum, has been the official office of the Prime Minister of the Netherlands since 1982.

History
This small octagonal building at the Hofvijver is first mentioned in chronicles in 1354 and probably dates from the first half of the 14th century. At the edge of the Parliament Buildings was originally a summer gazebo for Counts of Holland. It was connected by a drawbridge with the count's garden. At the site of this garden, later east of the Tower the Mauritshuis was built around 1640 as the residence for John Maurice, Prince of Nassau-Siegen. Today the Mauritshuis is a museum.

Usage
West of the Tower is the Mauritshuis and the Grenadiers Gate, that gives access to Parliament Buildings. Directly opposite the Tower are offices of the House of Representatives. The Tower itself is part of the portfolio of the "Rijksgebouwendienst". On its ground floor there is a small meeting room, and the first floor houses the office of the Prime Minister of the Netherlands and Minister of General Affairs. It was first used for this purpose by Ruud Lubbers when he became Prime Minister in 1982; before that it was used by the Minister of the Interior as his main office.

References

External links
 
  Ministry of General Affairs (Government.nl)

Government buildings in the Netherlands
Tourist attractions in South Holland
Towers in The Hague
Towers completed in the 14th century